Rock's Backpages is an online archive of music journalism, sourced from contributions to the music and mainstream press from the 1950s to the present day. The articles are full text and searchable, and all are reproduced with the permission of the copyright holders. The database was founded in 2000 by British music journalist Barney Hoskyns.  its database contains over 37,000 articles, including interviews, features and reviews, which covered popular music from blues and soul up to the present date. Rock's Backpages also features over 600 audio interviews with musicians from Jimi Hendrix and Johnny Cash to Kate Bush and Kurt Cobain.

The articles are sourced from magazines including Creem, Rolling Stone, New Musical Express, Melody Maker, Crawdaddy! and Mojo. The database contains contributions from over 700 journalists, primarily from the US and UK, including journalists such as Dave Marsh, Nick Kent, Charles Shaar Murray, Nick Tosches, Mick Farren, Vivien Goldman, Al Aronowitz and Ian MacDonald.

While some articles are free to read, access to most requires a subscription.

References

External links 
Rock's Backpages
Rock's Backpages Writers' Blogs
Review of Rock's Backpages in The Guardian (1 November 2001)
Library Journal Best Databases review (December 2011)
Library Journal review (April 2017)

Cultural studies
Internet properties established in 2000
Popular music
Online music and lyrics databases
British music websites